The Memphis Miracle was a 1994 meeting in Memphis, Tennessee, where representatives of Pentecostal and charismatic denominations and churches came together to form the Pentecostal/Charismatic Churches of North America (PCCNA), an interdenominational and racially inclusive partnership. The PCCNA was created to replace the Pentecostal Fellowship of North America (PFNA) which was formed in 1948 by white Pentecostal churches, but excluded black Pentecostal groups. The PCCNA was created to remedy the situation, and it was at the Memphis meeting that the PFNA and its members apologized to the black Pentecostal bodies.

References

Charismatic and Pentecostal Christianity